is a vertically scrolling shooter released for the Master System in 1988 in Europe and 1989 in the United States and Japan. The aircraft on the box cover resembles a Lockheed SR-71 Blackbird, and bears no resemblance to the player's plane in the game.

Gameplay
In Bomber Raid, the player controls a small "Freedom Fighter" aircraft able to fire different types of projectiles through five levels.

The player starts with three lives and a limited number of cluster bombs. Any collision with either an enemy aircraft or enemy fire results in the loss of a life. One type of enemy, a strange disk like object with a green and red flashing center, drops a powerup when destroyed. Power-ups, which can be a weapon power-up (P) which replace the standard twin cannon, speed power up (S) or provide the player with a comrade fighter plane in one out four formations (depending on the number of the power up) to assist in destroying enemies. Cluster bombs, will clear the screen of many enemies (except bosses). The cluster bomb's explosion is intensified by the number of comrade fighters and their formations. Power pods give extra points, weapon power-ups, and a temporary backup fighter.

References

External links

1988 video games
Master System games
Master System-only games
Sanritsu Denki games
Vertically scrolling shooters
Video games developed in Japan